Schaueria is a genus of flowering plants in the family Acanthaceae. They are endemic to Brazil, from Bahia to Rio Grande do Sul. They are characterized by small elongated white or yellow flowers and narrow to thread-like green or yellow bracts. They are found mainly in rain forests, semi-deciduous mountain forests, and restingas.  They are pollinated by bees and hummingbirds.

The genus was established by the German naturalist Christian Gottfried Daniel Nees von Esenbeck in 1838. It is considered monophyletic and includes fourteen species:

Schaueria calycotricha (Link & Otto) Nees 
(syn. Schaueria flavicoma)
Schaueria capitata Nees
Schaueria gonystachya (Nees & Mart.) Nees
Schaueria hirsuta Nees
Schaueria hirta A.L.A.Côrtes, T.F.Daniel, A.Rapin
Schaueria humuliflora Nees
Schaueria litoralis (Vell.) A.L.A.Côrtes
(syn. Schaueria lophura)
Schaueria lachynostachya A.L.A.Cortes & A.C.Mota
Schaueria marginata Nees 
Schaueria malifolia Nees 
Schaueria paranaensis  (Rizz.) A.L.A.Côrtes, T.F.Daniel, A.Rapini
(syn. Justicia paranaensis)
Schaueria parviflora (Leonard) T.F.Daniel
Schaueria pyramidalis A.L.A.Côrtes, T.F.Daniel, A.Rapini
Schaueria thyrsiflora A.L.A.Côrtes, T.F.Daniel, A.Rapini

See also

Justicia

References

Acanthaceae
Acanthaceae genera
Endemic flora of Brazil
Taxa named by Christian Gottfried Daniel Nees von Esenbeck